Remuna is a town and a notified area committee in Baleswar district in the Indian state of Odisha. It is famous for the Khirachora Gopinatha Temple.

Geography
It has an average elevation of 20 metres (65 feet).

Demographics
 India census Remuna had a population of 28,958. Males constitute 52% of the population and females 48%. Remuna has an average literacy rate of 63%, higher than the national average of 59.5%: male literacy is 69%, and female literacy is 53%. In Remuna, 14% of the population is under 6 years of age.

Tourism

Historical Place
Birthplace of Baladeva Vidyabhushana, eminent scholar who propounded Achintya Bhedabheda doctrine among Gaudiya Vaishnavas
Kshirachora Gopinatha Temple: This is an ancient Gopinatha temple built in the 12th century by King Langula Narasinha Deba of Utkala. Built in a Utkaliya style of temple architecture this temple is surrounded by few Mathas and temples along with the principal deity Gopinatha. Kheera Bhoga and Abadha prasada are the famous Bhoga of this temple.
Jagannath temple
Goudia Radhakrishna Temple
Gargeswara Mahadeba Temple
Saptasara River
Madhabendra Goudia Math
Kanaka Durga Temple
param vaisnavi matho, armala

Accommodation
Yatri Nivas, Remuna
Hotel star way ( Remuna Golei)

Art & Craft
Remuna is famous for brass and bronze applique and utensils which are very intricate and well crafted. The local artisans have been doing this for ages and selling them in the local market and exporting to other places.

Education

Schools-
1.* Remuna High School 
2.Januganj Nodal UP school
3.Kendriya Vidyalaya02
4.Ganeswarpur UP school
5.Oxford public school 
6.St Xavier School
7.Sri Aurobinda Purnanga Siksha Kendra
8.Saraswati sishu mandir
9.Vivekananda Siksha Kendra
10.S.u.n high school, mukhura. 
11. Armala nodal high school, armala                  
Colleges-
1.Remuna Junior/Degree College 
2. Govt. Polytechnic                                University-
1. F.M. University (Vyasa Vihar) 2. Govt. Medical College

Other Institutions
1. Balasore Institute of hotel management 
2. Basanti ITI

Transport and Communications
NH-5 Passes to the beginning of Remuna. Remuna is connected with City Bus, Auto, Local Buses, Trekkers from Balasore bus stand. Balasore bus stand is 5 km from Remuna. Balasore Railway station is 6 km from Remuna.

References

Cities and towns in Balasore district